The 2010 Santosh Trophy was the 64th edition of the tournament. All matches of the tournament from the quarter-finals stage were played at the Yuva Bharati Krirangan (Salt Lake Stadium) in Kolkata. The tournament began on 16 July 2010 and ended on 8 August 2010 when the final match was played between Bengal and Punjab.

Bengal defeated Punjab 2–1 to lift the trophy for a record 30th time.

Participating teams 
31 States / UT teams of India along with Services and Railways will participate in the tournament.

The defending champions Goa, runners-up West Bengal along with last year's losing semi-finalists Tamil Nadu and Services receive automatic qualification into the quarter-final stage.

Qualifying round

Cluster I

Cluster II

Cluster III

Cluster IV

Cluster V

Cluster VI

Cluster VII

Cluster VIII

Pre Quarter Final

Pre Quarter Final Match 1

Pre Quarter Final Match 2

Pre Quarter Final Match 3

Pre Quarter Final Match 4

Quarter-final

Group A

Group B

Semi-finals

Final 

Denson Devadas' brace was enough for West Bengal to claim their record 30th Santosh Trophy title, edging past Punjab 2–1 in the grand finale played at the Salt Lake Stadium at Kolkata. The hosts came back strongly after trailing by a goal to outclass the Jaagir Singh-coached side. Chirag United midfielder scored a goal in each half to seal the match.
Bengal looked the better side right from the word go and took an attacking approach, but were missing their two key strikers and it was clearly making things difficult for Coach Shabbir Ali. Tarif Ahmed struggled and was substituted at the half-hour mark.  Bengal could have scored in the 19th minute, but to their despair, a Gouranga Dutta right footer hit the woodwork.
It was Punjab who, in spite of a cautious start, took the lead in the 31st minute through Balwant Singh, before his right footer was saved by Abhra Mondal two minutes back. Bengal was not to throw in the towel and pulled one back at the stroke of half-time, with Denson heading in a Snehasish Chakraborty corner kick in the near post.
The half-time score was 1–1 with both teams leaving the match wide open. Bengal continued their good run and their hard work was finally paid, when Denson once again scored, with his 25-yard scorcher, leaving the Punjab goalkeeper Paramjit Singh stranded before hitting the woodwork and rolling inside in the 76th minute. Punjab tried hard in search of the equaliser, but Bengal successfully held their one-goal advantage to mark their 30th Santosh Trophy title.

MATCH OFFICIALS
 Referee: Pratap Singh (Uttarakhand)
 Assistant referees:
 Amjad Khan (WIFA)
 Srikrishna (Tamil Nadu)
 Fourth official: Magho Singh (Manipur)
 Referee Assessor: A.U.K Nair (Gujarat)
 Match Commissioner: S.S.Shetty (WIFA)

References 

2009–10 in Indian football
2010 domestic association football cups
2010